Hyposada is a genus of moths of the family Erebidae.

Species
 Hyposada addescens (Swinhoe, 1901) (from Australia)
 Hyposada aspersa (Turner, 1945) (from Australia)
 Hyposada assimilis Warren, 1914 (from Taiwan)
 Hyposada astona (Swinhoe, 1901) (from Borneo)
 Hyposada brunnea (Leech, 1900) (from Japan)
 Hyposada carneotincta Hampson, 1918 (from Malawi)
 Hyposada devia Hampson, 1918 (from New Guinea)
 Hyposada effectaria de Joannis, 1928 (from Vietnam)
 Hyposada erubescens Warren, 1913 (from Borneo)
 Hyposada fasciosa (Moore, 1888) (from India)
 Hyposada hirashimai Sugi, Sugi, Kuroko, Moriuti & Kawabe, 1982 (Japan, Hong Kong)
 Hyposada hydrocampata (Guenée, 1857) (Africa, India, Australia)
 Hyposada ineffectaria (Walker, 1861) (from Borneo)
 Hyposada juncturalis (Walker, [1866]) (from Sierra Leone)
 Hyposada kadooriensis Galsworthy, 1998 (from Hong Kong)
 Hyposada leucoma de Joannis, 1928 (from Vietnam)
 Hyposada melanosticta Hampson, 1910 (from Nigeria)
 Hyposada niveipuncta Warren, 1913 (from India)
 Hyposada pallidicosta Warren, 1913 (from India)
 Hyposada postvittata (Moore, 1887)(from Sri Lanka, Australia)
 Hyposada ruptifascia (Moore, 1888) (from India)
 Hyposada tritonia (Hampson, 1898) (from India)
 Hyposada zavattarii Berio, 1944 (from Ethiopia)

References

 
 

Boletobiinae
Noctuoidea genera